The East River Greenway (also called the East River Esplanade) is an approximately  foreshoreway for walking or cycling on the east side of the island of Manhattan on the East River. It is part of the Manhattan Waterfront Greenway. The largest portions are operated by the New York City Department of Parks and Recreation.  It is separated from motor traffic, and many sections also separate pedestrians from cyclists. The greenway is parallel to the Franklin D. Roosevelt East River Drive for a majority of its length.

Parts of the greenway were built at different times. Most of the greenway was built in the 1930 to 1950s in conjunction with the nearby FDR Drive, with exceptions:

 Waterside Plaza: 1973
 East River Waterfront: Late 1990s
 Stuyvesant Cove: 2002
 United Nations portion (under construction): 2015–24

Route

The greenway runs along the East Side, from Battery Park and past South Street Seaport to a dead end at 125th Street, East Harlem with a  gap from 41st to 60th streets in Midtown where pedestrians use busy First and Second Avenues to get around United Nations Headquarters between the Upper East Side and Kips Bay portions of the Greenway.

Some places are narrow due to sinkholes being blocked off by protective fencing, and one part squeezes between the highway and the dock of Con Edison's East River Station, requiring slower speeds.  Other parts are shared space with motor access to Waterside Plaza or a filling station. Approximately  near the southeast end is in the shadow of the elevated FDR Drive. This part is to be improved by the East River Esplanade project. In February 2019, NYC Parks allocated $75 million to complete the esplanade within East Harlem, East Midtown, and the Lower East Side.

In the summer of 2008 the East River Greenway, along with the Brooklyn Heights Promenade, provided viewing locations to see the New York City Waterfalls.

Components

East Harlem

The East Harlem section runs from the Triborough Bridge ramp at 124th Street to the Gracie Mansion site at 90th Street. It contains four footbridges across the FDR Drive as well as a footbridge, the Wards Island Bridge, to Randalls and Wards Islands at 103rd Street. A connection to the Harlem River Greenway at 132nd Street is expected to be built between 2021 and 2024.

Although the park is in East Harlem, where all residents have access to a pocket park, neighborhood park, or major park within , amenities are limited in this section of the greenway.  This decrepit portion of the East River Greenway has little open space and no recreation facilities.  NYC Parks allocated $25 million to stabilize the greenway between 114th and 117th Streets in 2019; at the time, the section between 107th and 114th Streets was closed off. The work was expected to take one year, but little progress was made during this period. The city allocated $284 million for repairs to the greenway, including the East Harlem section, in early 2021.

Upper East Side 

At 90th Street the Greenway rises to a walkway above the double-decker FDR Drive. The East River Greenway then passes along Carl Schurz Park near Gracie Mansion, and overlooks the waters of Hell Gate and Wards Island in the East River.  The Greenway is also the park's waterfront promenade, a deck built over the FDR Drive.  The park is bordered on the west by East End Avenue and on the south by Gracie Square, the extension of East 84th Street to the river.

The ramp opened in late 2017, replacing a staircase. The greenway continues to the Queensboro Bridge, with footbridges at 78th, 71st, and 63rd Streets.

The part of the greenway nearest the Queensboro Bridge was the topic of local plans released by Community Board 8 in 2002, and again in 2006.  Proposals included reusing a heliport building of the New York City Department of Sanitation at 59th Street, renovating existing parks nearby (including the Andrew Haswell Green Park between 60th and 62nd Streets), and using a disused vehicular ramp to connect the greenway to York Avenue at 60th Street. This renovation was funded by a development project at 73rd Street by the City University of New York and Memorial Sloan-Kettering Cancer Center. Further, $23 million from NYC Parks and $15 million from Rockefeller University were allocated to complete renovations to the section of the greenway between 62nd and 63rd Streets, which started in 2015.

United Nations

South of 60th Street, to 38th Street, the greenway enters its only undeveloped section, save for a small section accessed by a footbridge at 51st Street. In October 2011, the city and state reached an agreement to use the western portion of Robert Moses Playground at 41st Street for an expansion of the United Nations Headquarters campus. In exchange, the United Nations Development Corporation would pay $73 million to fund the development of the gap in the Greenway between 38th and 60th streets.

Designs for this part of the greenway were revealed in November 2013. The new design, which incorporates an amphitheater and a floating pier, is proposed to open in three phases. The first was to open in 2015 and the last by 2024. The three parts are between 38th, 41st, 53rd, and 60th Streets, with three gathering nodes along the way.

The greenway section between 38th and 41st Streets was completed in 2016 and reuses a structure last used by Con Edison. In April 2017, the city committed $100 million in funding toward building the other two parts of the greenway. The greenway section between 53rd and 60th Streets began construction in November 2019 and is expected to be completed in 2022. This section will include an ADA-accessible bridge at 54th Street.

Kips Bay/Waterside

This approximately  portion of the greenway, accessed by a pedestrian crosswalk at 37th Street, contains both the East 34th Street Ferry Landing and the East 34th Street Heliport, and formerly also was near the East 34th Street Ferry Landing.

The greenway portion and the apartment buildings that make up Waterside Plaza (as well as the neighboring United Nations International School) were constructed on top of platforms supported by over 2,000 concrete piles sunk into the East River. Developed by Richard Ravitch, the first apartment buildings opened in 1973 and the complex and greenway section was completed the following year.

Stuyvesant Cove Park 

The greenway enters Stuyvesant Cove Park (at ), a  public park that runs from  23rd Street to 18th Street, east of Avenue C. It is located to the south of Waterside Plaza and to the north of the East River Park, connecting to the Captain Patrick J. Brown Walk on the south end.

The park is located on the former brownfield site of a cement plant and a parking lot. A Riverwalk mixed-use development that would have included residential units, offices, a hotel and a marina was proposed in the 1980s but abandoned in 1992.  A plan released in 1997 gave way to the current park. Surplus cement dumped from trucks into the East River has created a small beach in the middle of the park near the end of 20th Street.

The park, which was completed in 2002, cost $8.3 million and was designed by Donna Walcavage Landscape Architecture. Solar 1, an environmental learning center with a small outdoor stage for public performances, is located at the north end of the park.

Captain Patrick J. Brown Walk

The next part of the greenway is the Captain Patrick J. Brown Walk (at ), a brick-paved walkway that connects Stuyvesant Cove Park on the north to East River Park to the south. Designed for use by pedestrians and cyclists, it runs approximately between 15th and 18th streets, and Avenues C and D, and was named in 2002.

It was named after Captain Patrick J. Brown, a firefighter who died in the September 11 attacks, and who lived in nearby Stuyvesant Town.

The East River Blueway plan between 38th Street and the Brooklyn Bridge, released on February 7, 2013, would elevate the walkway above the FDR Drive, with ramps rising to a gradual pedestrian bridge located where the 15th Street bottleneck is now. Then-Manhattan Borough President Scott Stringer pledged $3.5 million toward the whole plan.

East River Park

Officially called the "East River Waterfront Esplanade", the greenway goes into East River Park (at ), which is a  public park located on the Lower East Side. The park stretches from East 12th Street down to Montgomery Street on the east side of the FDR Drive. The southern entrance boasts good views of the Manhattan Bridge and Brooklyn Bridge.  The amphitheater, built in 1941 just south of Grand Street, has been reconstructed and is often used for public performances.  The park includes football, baseball and soccer fields, tennis, basketball and handball courts, a running track, and bike paths. Fishing is another popular activity.  The park is bisected by the Williamsburg Bridge.

East River Waterfront

The last part of the greenway is the East River Waterfront Project, also referred to as the "East River Esplanade", though the latter name includes other features along the waterfront. It consists of  along the East River waterfront between Montgomery Street, along South Street, to the Battery Maritime Building east of Battery Park. A bike lane in Pike Street connects to the Manhattan Bridge. The project aims to rehabilitate the existing waterfront space and connect it to two existing waterfront parks, Battery Park and East River Park. Upon completion in 2015, the East River Esplanade is slated to feature three rebuilt piers (14, 15, and 35) new glass pavilions underneath the elevated FDR Drive, new bike lanes, recreational facilities, and waterfront seating.

Origins 
The East River waterfront in Lower Manhattan was known for heavy maritime activity, with over 40 piers in operation by the later 1950s. The busy waterfront provided easy access to New York Harbor and the Atlantic Ocean in the south, the Hudson River on the west, with a connection to the Erie Canal. However, the rise of truck traffic and the transfer of port activity to the Port Newark-Elizabeth Marine Terminal drastically reduced maritime traffic on the river after the middle 20th century. With many piers now defunct, ambitious plans have been made to reclaim and reuse the pier space. The north–south arterial highway, the FDR Drive, was moved to an elevated location to allow convenient access to the piers. In the 1970s, the Water Street Access Plan was drafted to extend the confines of the traditional Financial District eastward and create a new business corridor along Water Street, south of Fulton Street. Noting the success of the World Financial Center, the East Side Landing plan was created in the 1980s to add commercial and office buildings along the waterfront, again south of Fulton Street, similar to Battery Park City. This plan never materialized.

In 1982, there was a plan to expand the Seaport Museum of New York and attract tourist activity. Parts of the district were devoted to retail, including the main building of the Fulton Fish Market. A modern shopping mall was then built on Pier 17 and was opened on September 11, 1985. Furthermore, the Fulton Fish Market formerly located around South Street and Fulton Street, was pressured to relocate in 2005 to Hunts Point in the Bronx due to plans for the redevelopment of the Manhattan waterfront.

The pedestrian and bike path was first established in the late 1990s between Montgomery Street in the Lower East Side and Broad Street in the Financial District. Benches were also added along the partially restored waterfront. The pedestrian path/bikeway has been well received by community members. Drawbacks exist however:
The pedestrian path and bikeway are not segregated from each other; there is one lane in each direction which is shared by pedestrians and bikers. 
The path curves around FDR Drive viaduct pillars. 
The path occupies a narrow portion of the space below the viaduct; in most cases, the rest of the space is used as parking facilities and storage space.
Amenities are few. 
Its legacy as a service and commercial zone offer limited pedestrian access. 
City services, such as the Department of Sanitation, use the waterfront for equipment.

During Michael Bloomberg's tenure as mayor, he spearheaded the PlaNYC 2030 initiative, which highlights projects and plans to transform the city by the year 2030. An important focus was put on the waterfront, including the East River waterfront. Bloomberg also stressed the importance of ferry transport, as an alternative to existing land transport options. The Pier 11/Wall Street ferry terminal has long operated East River waterfront, with regular trips to New Jersey. In June 2011, a ferry service to piers on Brooklyn's waterfront started.

Renovation 
SHoP Architects led the design process in the creation of the East River Esplanade, consulting community members during the planning years between 2002 and 2006. A year-long study was undertaken in 2004, allowing designers to derive ways that would "enhance waterfront access". Other groups critical to the project's planning phase include the New York City Department of Transportation, the Department of Parks and Recreation, the Economic Development Corporation, the Department of City Planning and other agencies and groups. $137 million was secured with the Lower Manhattan Development Corporation, and work began on a "pilot section" in 2009 between John Street and Wall Street.

According to the Department of City Planning, the overall plan is listed as:
The esplanade itself: The new esplanade will consist of a recreation zone along the water's edge with seating and plantings, pavilions under the FDR Drive to support outdoor activities, and a bikeway along South Street that ties into the Manhattan Greenway. Consistent paving, seating, railings, and lighting will be used throughout.
Pavilions and "get-downs": New, proposed pavilions will help reconnect the city to the river's edge, creating concentrated areas for recreation where appropriate. At Peck Slip and Rutgers Slip, the new esplanade design will mark historic locations by carving steps into the bulkhead line—creating means to "get down" to the water.
Archipelago: In order to provide a continuous greenway between Battery Park and the new East River Waterfront, the path between the Battery Maritime Building and Old Slip will be extended over the existing shoreline, creating a walkway out over the water with a view of the city.
Pier 15: The proposed pier will lift its primary recreation area to a second tier, offering new and intimate views of the tall, historic ships that could be docked in this location.
Pier 35: This large pier will be opened to the public with a second tier, which will function as an amphitheater that faces west-southwest toward Governors Island, Brooklyn, Battery Park and the New York Harbor. It is connected to the greenway by a bridge.
Sustainability: In keeping with the city's PlaNYC initiatives, the East River Waterfront project will seek LEED certification for its pavilions and park uses. Plans aim to reduce energy demand and consumption, conserve natural resources, improve air quality, and catch and reuse rainwater water.

The FDR Drive viaduct will be clad, and South Street will be narrowed for much of its length to make room for additional sidewalk space. The glass pavilions will be located underneath the viaduct, and the bike lanes would be moved to the side of the pavilion, underneath the FDR Drive. The piers would be reconstructed to encourage marine growth, by having reef balls to attract fish populations.

Access to the Esplanade from the neighboring areas would be undertaken with the redevelopment of "slips" - wedge-shaped road shapes which previously allowed ships to berth. Some of these slips have been used as parking facilities, while others are the southern termini for critical north–south thoroughfares. Reconstructions of the existing slips in the Financial District, the Lower East Side and Chinatown will feature bikeways and landscaped medians. Five of these slip projects are at varying stages of construction. From east to west, they are Montgomery Slip, Rutgers Slip, Pike Slip, Peck Slip, and Burling Slip.

Renovation phases
The project is being undertaken in three phases, with first phase completed (including Pier 15). Second phase construction started in summer 2011 (from Old Slip to the Battery Maritime Building). Construction on the third phase (Pike Slip to Pier 35, Montgomery Slip) began in fall 2011. This phase will last until 2014 and will cover the rehabilitation underneath the FDR Drive from Maiden Lane to Pier 35. Phase 4 between Catherine and Pike Slips was completed in 2015.

Storm barrier

There are plans for a new storm barrier along the southern third of the greenway, between West 57th and East 42nd Streets. The final proposal, which is geographically U-shaped, will include many features. Under the elevated FDR Drive structure above South Street will be storm barriers hanging from the viaduct's ceiling, which will drop down in case of a storm. A "Battery Berm" will be located at Battery Park, and a maritime museum will be opened on the site of a former Coast Guard building there. The proposal, by Rebuild by Design, will also include components for storm barriers in Hunts Point, Bronx and on Staten Island. The first component, a  barrier on the Lower East Side between Montgomery and East 13th Streets called "The Bridging Berm", will cost $335 million. In addition to storm protection, the berm—the first of three of the barrier's components—will also provide a pedestrian pathway and bikeway on top of berm, boating and fishing docks, a slope down to current sports fields, upgraded ADA-accessible ramps for bridges across the FDR Drive, and construction materials such as "slurry walls, concrete blocks, a compacted embankment, a clay cap, topsoil and salt-tolerant landscaping." The total cost of the project is over $3.5 billion.

References

Sources

External links

 
 New York City Department of Parks & Recreation info for East River Park
 NYCEDC website for East River Esplanade
 Stuyvesant Cove Park Association
 Stuyvesant Cove Park - Solar One

Parks in Manhattan
East River
Robert Moses projects
Bike paths in New York City
Redeveloped ports and waterfronts in the United States
Lower East Side
Financial District, Manhattan
Chinatown, Manhattan
Murray Hill, Manhattan
Headquarters of the United Nations
Upper East Side
East Harlem
Cycling in New York City
Transportation in Manhattan
Manhattan Waterfront Greenway
Greenways in New York City
Hiking trails in New York City